The 1949 Philippine presidential and vice presidential elections were held on November 8, 1949. Incumbent President Elpidio Quirino won a full term as President of the Philippines after the death of President Manuel Roxas in 1948. His running mate, Senator Fernando Lopez, won as Vice President.  Despite factions created in the administration party, Quirino won a satisfactory vote from the public. It was the only time in Philippine history where the duly elected president, vice president and senators all came from the same party, the Liberal Party. Carlos P. Romulo and Marvin M. Gray, publisher of the Manila Evening News, accuse Quirino in their book The Magsaysay Story of widespread fraud and intimidation of the opposition by military action, calling it the "dirty election".

Criticism of the election
The election was widely criticized as being corrupt, with violence and fraud taking place. Opponents of Quirino were either beaten up or murdered by his supporters or the police, and the election continues to be perceived as corrupt.

Results

President

Vice-President

See also
Commission on Elections
Politics of the Philippines
Philippine elections
President of the Philippines
2nd Congress of the Philippines

References

External links
 The Philippine Presidency Project
 Official website of the Commission on Elections

1949
1949 elections in the Philippines